The Subconscious Art of Graffiti Removal (USA, 2001, 16 min) is an experimental documentary directed by filmmaker Matt McCormick, based on the ideas of Avalon Kalin and narrated by Miranda July that makes the tongue-in-cheek argument that municipal efforts by Portland, Oregon to mask and erase graffiti is an important new movement in modern art stemming from the repressed artistic desires of city workers.

The film screened at Sundance Film Festival and the Museum of Modern Art and received both critical and popular acclaim.

References

Documentary films about graffiti
2001 short documentary films
Graffiti in the United States
Documentary films about cities in the United States
Films shot in Oregon
Culture of Portland, Oregon
2001 films
American short documentary films
American avant-garde and experimental films
2000s avant-garde and experimental films
Documentary films about Oregon
2000s English-language films
2000s American films